The 2020–21 Thai League 3 Northeastern region is a region in the regional stage of the 2020–21 Thai League 3. Due to the COVID-19 pandemic, the season must be postponed to start in late 2020 and end in early 2021. In addition, the Thai League 4 had combined with the Thai League 3 and compete as Thai League 3 since this season and there is no relegation in this season. A total of 11 teams located in Northeastern of Thailand will compete in the league of the Northeastern region.

In late December 2020, COVID-19 had spread again in Thailand, the FA Thailand must abruptly end the regional stage of the Thai League 3.

Teams

Number of teams by province

Stadiums and locations

Foreign players

A T3 team could register four foreign players by at least one player from AFC member countries. A team can use four foreign players on the field in each game, including at least one player from the AFC member countries (3+1).
Note :: players who released during winter transfer window;: players who registered during winter transfer window;↔: players who have dual nationality by half-caste or naturalization.→: players who left club after registered during first or second leg.
{|class="unsortable"
|-
| style="width:15px; background:#ffdddd;"| ||Other foreign players.
|-
| style="width:15px; background:#ffffdd;"| ||AFC quota players.
|-
| style="width:15px; background:#c8ccd1;"| ||No foreign player registered.
|}

League table

Standings

Positions by round

Results by round

Results

Season statistics

Top scorers 
As of 3 January 2021.

Hat-tricks 

Notes: 4 = Player scored 4 goals; 5 = Player scored 5 goals; (H) = Home team; (A) = Away team

Clean sheets 
As of 3 January 2021.

See also
 2020–21 Thai League 1
 2020–21 Thai League 2
 2020–21 Thai League 3
 2020–21 Thai League 3 Northern Region
 2020–21 Thai League 3 Eastern Region
 2020–21 Thai League 3 Western Region
 2020–21 Thai League 3 Southern Region
 2020–21 Thai League 3 Bangkok Metropolitan Region
 2020–21 Thai League 3 National Championship
 2020–21 Thai FA Cup
 2020 Thailand Champions Cup

References

External links
 Official website of Thai League

Thai League 3
3